Digitalis sceptrum is a species of Digitalis from Madeira.

References

External links
 
 

sceptrum
Flora of Madeira
Endemic flora of Madeira